United States gubernatorial elections were held in 1893, in five states.

Virginia holds its gubernatorial elections in odd numbered years, every 4 years, following the United States presidential election year. Massachusetts and Rhode Island at this time held gubernatorial elections every year, which they would abandon in 1920 and 1912, respectively. Iowa and Ohio at this time held gubernatorial elections in every odd numbered year.

Results

References

Notes

Bibliography 
 
 
 
 
 

 
November 1893 events